Tsuruno (written: 靏野 or 鶴野) is a Japanese surname. Notable people with the surname include:

, Japanese footballer
, Japanese actor, television personality and musician

Japanese-language surnames